William Whitaker may refer to:

 William Whitaker (theologian) (1548–1595), English theologian
 William Whitaker (Puritan ejected minister) (1629–1672), English ejected minister
 William Whitaker (geologist) (1836–1925), British geologist
 William Whitaker (pioneer) (1821–1888), American pioneer
 William Whitaker (MP) (1580–1646), English lawyer and politician who sat in the House of Commons from 1640 to 1646
 William Whitaker (equestrian) (born 1989), English show jumper
 Bill Whitaker (journalist) (born 1951), American journalist
 Bill Whitaker (American football) (born 1959), American football defensive back

See also 
 William Whittaker (disambiguation)
 Whitaker (disambiguation)
 William Whitaker's Words, a computer program for Latin morphology